Roy Cross (born 4 December 1947) is an English former footballer who played as a central defender. He played 161 games in a nine-year career in the Football League, 182 games in four seasons of play in the Southern League, and finally made 54 appearances in two Alliance Premier League campaigns.

He began his career at Walsall, making his debut in the 1966–67 season. However he featured just 13 times in four seasons before he moved on to Port Vale in July 1970. He was an ever-present in the 1971–72 season and made 134 consecutive appearances from his debut until he twisted his knee in March 1973. Another knee injury seven months later then caused him to be sidelined for 17 months. He took a free transfer to Nuneaton Borough at the end of the 1974–75 season. He made 236 league and cup appearances over the next six seasons at Nuneaton, lifting the Birmingham Senior Cup in 1980, before he retired due to other work commitments the following year.

Career

Walsall
Cross began his career at Walsall, who finished 12th in the Third Division in 1966–67 under the stewardship of Ray Shaw. New boss Ron Lewin then took the "Saddlers" to a seventh-place finish in 1967–68. After a 13th-place finish in 1968–69, Bill Moore returned to lead Walsall to 12th place in 1969–70. Cross played just 12 league games in his four years at Fellows Park as he was unable to dislodge club favourite Stan Jones.

Port Vale
He joined Gordon Lee's Port Vale in July 1970; he was signed to replace retiring number five Roy Sproson, who had been with the club for over 20 years. He made his debut on 5 September, in a 1–0 win over Preston North End at Vale Park. He played 42 Third Division games in the 1970–71 season, and scored his first goal in the Football League on 2 January, in a 2–1 win over Doncaster Rovers at Belle Vue. He was an ever-present in the 1971–72 season, playing all 46 league and five cup games. He made 40 appearances in the 1972–73 season, and ended a series of 134 consecutive appearances from his debut in March 1973 when he wrenched his left knee. He recovered from this injury to play just two games in the 1973–74 campaign, but then he injured his knee ligaments in October 1973 and was out of action for 17 months. He managed to play just two games in the 1974–75 season, and was handed a free transfer in May 1975 by Roy Sproson, who was the club's new manager.

Nuneaton Borough
He went on to join Nuneaton Borough, who had just finished as runners-up in the Southern League Premier Division; he was signed alongside Walsall's Stan Bennett, and the pair would go on to reform their Walsall centre-back partnership at Nuneaton. He made a total of 50 appearances in the 1975–76 season, but was released at the end of the campaign. However Stan Bennett was appointed player-manager and approached Cross about re-signing, which he agreed to do. He scored his second – and final – career goal on 26 March 1979, the fourth goal of a 4–0 win over Wealdstone at Manor Park. At the end of the 1978–79 season, Nuneaton were invited to join the newly created Alliance Premier League. He played in the Birmingham Senior Cup final victory over Lye Town on 12 April 1980. He featured 25 times in the 1980–81 season, which saw the club relegated into the Southern League Midland Division. He left the club in the summer after finding that work commitments hampered his training, whilst the signing of Richard Dixey from Scarborough meant the club could afford to let him go.

Personal and later life
He got married in 1970. Upon his retirement as a player, he became a School of Excellence coach at Stoke City. He later went on to become a teacher for 25 years.

Career statistics
Source:

Honours
Nuneaton Borough
Birmingham Senior Cup: 1980

References

1947 births
Living people
Sportspeople from Wednesbury
English footballers
Association football defenders
Walsall F.C. players
Port Vale F.C. players
Nuneaton Borough F.C. players
English Football League players
Southern Football League players
National League (English football) players
Association football coaches
Stoke City F.C. non-playing staff
Schoolteachers from Staffordshire